= Pang Pir railway station =

Railway station in Pakistan

General information
- Owner: Ministry of Railways

Other information
- Station code: PNP

Pang Pir railway station (Urdu: پانگ پیر ریلوے اسٹیشن) is located in Pakistan.

== See also ==
- List of railway stations in Pakistan
- Pakistan Railways
